= Gil Noam =

Gil Gabriel Noam, Ed.D., Dr. Habil is the founder and director of The PEAR Institute: Partnerships in Education and Resilience. and an associate professor at Harvard Medical School and McLean Hospital. Trained as a clinical and developmental psychologist and psychoanalyst in both Europe and the United States, Noam has a strong interest in supporting resilience in youth, especially in educational settings. He served as the director of the Risk and Prevention program, and is the founder of the RALLY Prevention Program, a Boston-based intervention that bridges social and academic support in school, afterschool, and community settings. Noam has also followed a large group of high-risk children into adulthood in a longitudinal study that explores clinical, educational, and occupational outcomes.

Since the establishment of PEAR, Noam and his team have been contributing to the effort to establish the field of afterschool education. Noam has published over 200 papers, articles, and books in the areas of child and adolescent development as well as risk and resiliency in clinical, school and afterschool settings. He served as the editor-in-chief of the journal New Directions in Youth Development: Theory, Practice and Research, which has a strong focus on out-of-school time.

Noam lives in Cambridge, MA.

== Education ==
- 1972 BA (equiv.) in Psychology, Freie Universitaet, Berlin, Germany
- 1975 Dipl. Psych. in Clinical Psychology, Freie Universitaet, Berlin, Germany
- 1984 EdD in Human Development and Psychology, Harvard Graduate School of Education
- 1993 Habilitation (PhD level) in Clinical Psychology, University of Fribourg, Switzerland
